Roger Kirk was born in East London and brought up and educated in Norfolk.

Career

Roger Kirk was originally named Peter Wright.
After training in engineering at King's Lynn Technical College, he started his interest in radio at Hospital Radio Tunbridge Wells and then landed a job as a "tech-op" for the BBC where he worked on numerous BBC Radio 1 programmes.

In 1971, he presented for Radio North Sea International, but soon left due to seasickness. By 1973, he had joined London's Capital FM - then known as Capital Radio - as a sound engineer (after originally applying as a presenter) and stayed there until 1975 when he landed a presenting job at Bradford's Pennine Radio.

In the late 1980s he presented for Classic Gold , Hallam FM, Viking FM and 97.2 Stray FM. He was also the first presenter on Magic 828 in Leeds and hosted its breakfast show at launch in 1990. A few years later he presented late-night phone-in shows on Hallam FM and Viking FM.

Roger died in 2001.

References

External links
 mediauk.com - Profile.
 digitalspy.co.uk - Thread about late night radio.

British radio DJs
British radio personalities
British radio people
Offshore radio broadcasters
Year of birth missing
2001 deaths